The ABC TV, or just ABC, is a television cable station network in the City of Asunción, capital of Paraguay. The content is based on local, regional and world news, culture, sports, music, variety and investigative journalism; available on cable and satellite in all Latin America. It's part of The Grupo ABC Comunicaciones along with the newspaper ABC Color, ABC Cardinal 730AM and ABC FM 98.5. The television studios is headquartered in the historic center of the City, on Yegros street 745 & Herrera, with entrance to the TV Studios on Iturbe street.

History 
It was launched in August 2017, in the midst of celebrations for the 50th anniversary of the newspaper ABC Color. To this day, it is one of the most watched news channels in paraguayan cable and satellite due to the quality of the news, reports and investigations that are carried out and has reporters and journalists for his newspaper, radio and TV all across the country.

Actual programming

Monday to Friday 

 Madrugada ABC
 La Primera Mañana
 ABC Noticias Primera
 A La Gran 730
 Cardinal Deportivo
 ABC Noticias Mediodía
 Ensiestados
 Factor Clave
 Crimen & Castigo
 ABC Noticias Central
 Peligro de Gol
 Mesa de Periodistas
 ABC Motor 360
 Enfoque Cooperativo
 Líderes

Saturdays 

 Contacto Ciudadano
 No Tiene Nombre
 Enfoque Económico
 ABC Noticias Mediodía
 Cardinal Deportivo
 Poli Depo Rtivo
 Grandes Documentales
 Espacio de Tendencias
 Empresas & Empresarios TV
 ABC Rural
 Otro Level
 Pase Total
 Un mundo alucinante
 El Quincho del Rock

Sundays 

 Entre Gallos y Medianoche
 ABC Rural
 Medalla Milagrosa - Mi cooperativa al día
 Empresas & Empresarios
 Música Viva
 El Quincho del Rock
 Grandes Documentales
 Espacios & Tendencias
 Pase Total
 Un mundo alucinante
 Expediente Abierto
 Periodística Mente
 EN Detalles
 Líderes

Actual Journalists, TV Figures and Hosts 
 Nelson Rivera
 Juan Martín Figueredo
 Rodolfo López
 Luis Martínez
 Nilda Vera
 Sara Moreno
 Javier Panza
 Enrique Vargas Peña
 Guillermo Domaniczcky
 Diego Marini
 Letizia Medina
 Ariel Palacios
 Mabel Rehnfeldt
 Pablo Guerrero
 Rubén Darío Orué
 Federico Arias
 Bruno Pont
 Daniel Chung
 Ariel Marecos
 Yennyfer Caballero
 Darío Ibarra
 Denisse Hutter
 Gladys Benítez
 Fiona Aquino
 Iván Leguizamón
 Osvaldo Cáceres
 Giuliana Tewes
 Federico Galeano Estigarribia
 Carlos Ortega
 Viviana Benítez
 Marcos Cáceres
 Edgardo Romero
 Manuel Ferreira
 Roberto Sosa
 Prince Otto
 Víctor Florentín
 Maripili Alonso
 Luis López
 Gabo Baierling
 Marta Escurra
 Magdalena Benítez
 Sergio Resquín
 Carlos Benítez

See also 
 Television in Paraguay
 Trece
 Telefuturo
 C9N (in spanish)
 Sistema Nacional de Televisión
 GEN (in spanish)
 NPY (in spanish)
 Unicanal
 Paravisión

Television stations in Paraguay
Television channels and stations established in 2007
Spanish-language television stations